Hurdang is a 2022 Indian Hindi-language romantic drama film directed by Nikhil Nagesh Bhat. The film stars Sunny Kaushal, Nushrratt Bharuccha and Vijay Varma. It is a love story set in the backdrop of the student agitation of 1990 in Allahabad.

The principal photography commenced on 6 July 2019. The film was released theatrically on 8 April 2022.

Plot 
Back in 1990s, an aspiring IAS student starts a rebellion against the caste-based reservation to be implemented by the Mandal Commission.

Daddu is madly in love with Jhulan. They both have on and off relationship with each other. Loha bhaiya is a local goon wants to be taken seriously as a politician and is backed by one of the known politicians in the area.

Daddu, Jhulan and their friends are studying and planning to give exams to become IAS officers one day. Jhulan knows her potential and works hard towards trying to achieve her dream. Daddu on the other hand wants to leak papers and pass just so he could ask Jhulan's parents if he could marry her. He is seen leaking few papers with help of Loha bhaiya who gets fair share of the amount they collect by selling these papers to students.

And one day there comes a news that V.P Singh government had made up its mind to implement the report put forth by the Mandal Commission, which talked about giving reservations to socially backward classes. There were widespread protests held all over India and in Allahabad, Loha wants to take advantages of this situation. He pushes Daddu to fuel the fire and get students in his campus to protest against the Mandal Commission. 

While all this is happening, Jhulan breaks up with him and is planned to get married off to an IAS officer who is naive and believes her stress to be nervousness. On the day riots are at their highest and students get arrested including Daddu, Jhulan is getting married same day and Daddu gets to know about it. 

He disguises himself as a policeman and flies the station only to know that Jhulan is already married and has given sleeping pills to her husband. They both flee from there and go to Loha's place. Before they leave from there so that no one knows Jhulan is not with her husband Loha insists Daddu to go to riots one last time and lead the crowd. 

Loha has planned to burn Daddu alive which is noticed by his best friend, and he pushes Daddu and gets burned himself. When Daddu finally comprehends that this was Loha's plan all along, he kills Loha and his brother. The movie ends with Jhulan and Daddu going to meet president about the request to stop Mandal commission.

Cast 
 Sunny Kaushal as Daddu Thakur
 Nushrratt Bharuccha as Jhulan Yadav
 Vijay Varma as Loha Singh
 Shubhashish Jha as Ranjan

Soundtrack 

The music of the film is composed by Amaal Malik and Sachet-Parampara with lyrics written by Rashmi Virag and Irshad Kamil.

References

External links
 
 

2020s Hindi-language films
T-Series (company) films
Indian romantic drama films
2022 romantic drama films
Films scored by Sachet–Parampara
Works about reservation in India
V. P. Singh administration
Films set in the 1990s
Union Public Service Commission
Films set in Uttar Pradesh